Horonaim ( Ḥōrōnayīm) is a city in Moab, mentioned in two Hebrew Bible oracles against the nation of Moab: in the Book of Jeremiah, and in the Book of Isaiah,. In 2 Samuel, an addition from  the Septuagint text is sometimes translated as Horonaim (in e.g. NIV, ISV), although it possibly derives from as little as a preposition.

There is some reason to identify Horonaim with the city Horonan (Moabite: 𐤇𐤅𐤓𐤍𐤍 *Ḥawrānān), named in the Mesha Stele (lines 31 and 32). The name may derive from the god Horon, or from Western Semitic words for cave, cavern, hollow or valley.

See also
Isaiah 15

References

Hebrew Bible cities
Moab